Justin Louis Thomas (born April 29, 1993) is an American professional golfer who plays on the PGA Tour and is former World Number One. In 2017, Thomas experienced a breakout year, winning five PGA Tour events and the FedEx Cup championship.  He has won two major golf championships, winning the PGA Championship in 2017 and 2022.  In May 2018, Thomas became the 21st player to top the Official World Golf Ranking.

Early years and education
Thomas was born on April 29, 1993 and raised in Louisville, Kentucky. He attended North Oldham Middle School.  Prior to his junior year in high school, he played in the Wyndham Championship on the PGA Tour in August 2009 and became the third-youngest to make the cut in a PGA Tour event, at 16 years, 3 months and 24 days. Thomas graduated from St. Xavier High School in 2011.

Thomas played college golf at the University of Alabama, where he placed first six times for the Crimson Tide. As a freshman in 2012, he won the Haskins Award as the most outstanding collegiate golfer. He was on the national championship team of 2013.

Thomas' father, Mike Thomas, has been the head professional at the Harmony Landing Country Club in Goshen, Kentucky, since 1990. Thomas grew up an avid fan of his hometown Louisville Cardinals.

Professional career
Thomas turned professional in 2013 and earned his tour card on the Web.com Tour through qualifying school. He won his first professional event at the 2014 Nationwide Children's Hospital Championship. Thomas finished fifth in the 2014 Web.com Tour regular season, and third after the Web.com Tour Finals, and earned his PGA Tour card for the 2015 season. In 2015, Thomas collected seven top-10s and 15 top-25s, with fourth-place finishes at the Quicken Loans National and Sanderson Farms Championship as his best results. He finished 32nd at the PGA Tour's FedEx Cup, losing the Rookie of the Year award to Daniel Berger.

On November 1, 2015, Thomas earned his first victory on the PGA Tour by winning the CIMB Classic in Kuala Lumpur, Malaysia, by a single stroke over Adam Scott. He overcame a double bogey on the 14th hole during the final round and holed a six-foot (1.8 m) par putt to claim the win by a stroke. Thomas had earlier shot a course-record 61 during the second round to contribute to a 26-under-par winning score.

2016–17 PGA Tour: five wins, first major, FedEx Cup champion, Player of the Year

Thomas successfully defended his title at the CIMB Classic in October 2016 for his second tour win.

Thomas won the SBS Tournament of Champions in January 2017 for his third PGA Tour win.

In the following week's tournament, the Sony Open in Hawaii, Thomas became the seventh player in PGA Tour history to shoot a 59. During the first round, he opened his round with an eagle and needed to make an eagle on the ninth, his last hole of the day, to shoot 59. He became the youngest player to shoot a sub-60 round. Thomas finished with rounds of 64, 65, and 65 to win the tournament by 7 strokes. He set tournament records for 18, 36, 54, and 72 holes (59, 123, 188, and 253, respectively). He set PGA Tour records at 36 and 72 holes and tied the 54-hole record.

During the third round of the 2017 U.S. Open at Erin Hills, Thomas equalled the U.S. Open single-round record of 63. He eagled the last hole by hitting his 3-wood to 8 feet on the par-5 hole to finish at 9-under-par, also a U.S. Open record, passing the previous record held by Johnny Miller at Oakmont Country Club. In the fourth round, he played alongside Brian Harman in the final grouping, the first time he had done that in a major championship. He shot a three-over-par 75 and finished in a tie for ninth place.

In August 2017, Thomas won his first major, the 2017 PGA Championship, winning by two shots.

At the Dell Technologies Championship, Thomas became just the fourth golfer to win five times, including a major, in a PGA Tour season since 1960 before his 25th birthday, joining Jack Nicklaus, Tiger Woods, and Jordan Spieth.

After finishing runner-up to Xander Schauffele at the Tour Championship, Thomas became the FedEx Cup champion on September 24, 2017.

2017–18 PGA Tour
In October 2017, Thomas won the third event of the 2017–18 season, the CJ Cup in South Korea. He defeated Marc Leishman with a birdie on the second extra hole of a sudden-death playoff. The win was Thomas' seventh on the PGA Tour.

In February 2018, Thomas won for the eighth time on tour, claiming victory at the Honda Classic in Palm Beach Gardens, Florida. He birdied the final hole of regulation play to make a playoff with Luke List. Then on the first extra hole, Thomas made birdie again on the same hole, after a 5-wood from the fairway. List could not hole his birdie putt, after the missing the green to the right, resulting in Thomas winning the tournament. The win lifted Thomas to the top of the FedEx Cup standings and number three in world rankings.

The following week, Thomas lost in a sudden-death playoff to Phil Mickelson, at the WGC-Mexico Championship. He had been even par for the tournament after the first two rounds, but then shot 62–64 over the weekend for a total of 16 under par. To finish his final round, Thomas holed his second shot to the 18th for eagle. Thomas lost the playoff to par, after going over the back of the green in the first extra hole and failing to up and down for par. Thomas moved to number two in the world rankings, a career best ranking.

Thomas had another chance to claim the top spot in the world later on in March at the WGC-Match Play, but he was beaten 3 & 2 by Bubba Watson in the semi-finals. He then went on to lose the consolation match 5 & 3 to Alex Norén to finish in fourth place. The result extended his lead at the top of the FedEx Cup standings and reduced the gap on the world number one, Dustin Johnson.

After the 2018 Players Championship, Thomas replaced Johnson as the world number one golfer. He lost that ranking after four weeks when Johnson won the FedEx St. Jude Classic.

In September 2018, Thomas qualified for the U.S. team participating in the 2018 Ryder Cup. Europe defeated the U.S. team 17 1/2 to 10 1/2. Notwithstanding the loss, Thomas played well. He went 4–1–0. He won his singles match against Rory McIlroy.

2018–19 PGA Tour
On February 17, 2019, Thomas led the Genesis Open entering the final round. Gusty conditions led to Thomas shooting 75 and finishing second to champion J. B. Holmes. At one point, Thomas four-putted for a double bogey, the last three putts were inside 8 feet and the final miss was from 2 feet.

On August 18, 2019, Thomas shot 25-under-par and won the BMW Championship at Medinah Country Club outside of Chicago. This was the second leg of the three-tournament 2019 FedEx Cup Playoffs and put Thomas in the lead in the FedEx Cup standings heading into the Tour Championship at East Lake Golf Club.

2019–20 PGA Tour
On October 20, 2019, Thomas won the CJ Cup in South Korea. This was his second win of the tournament in its three-year existence.

In December 2019, Thomas played on the U.S. team at the 2019 Presidents Cup at Royal Melbourne Golf Club in Australia. The U.S. team won 16–14. Thomas went 3–1–1 and lost his Sunday singles match against Cameron Smith.

On January 5, 2020, Thomas won the Sentry Tournament of Champions at Kapalua Resort in Maui, Hawaii for the second time. Thomas won in a playoff over Xander Schauffele and Patrick Reed.

On August 2, 2020, Thomas won the WGC-FedEx St. Jude Invitational at TPC Southwind in Tennessee by three strokes over four other players. This was the second time that Thomas had won the event and his 13th career victory on the PGA Tour. He came from four strokes behind overnight leader Brendon Todd to prevail on the final day. The win took Thomas to Number One in the Official World Golf Ranking for the second time in his career.

2020–21 PGA Tour

In March 2021, Thomas shot a final round four-under par 68 to win the 2021 Players Championship by one stroke over Lee Westwood.

In September 2021, Thomas played on the U.S. team in the 2021 Ryder Cup at Whistling Straits in Kohler, Wisconsin. The U.S. team won 19–9 and Thomas went 2–1–1 and won his Sunday singles match against Tyrrell Hatton.

2021–22 PGA Tour: one win, second major
For the 2021–22 season, Thomas employed Jim "Bones" Mackay to replace his previous caddie, Jimmy Johnson. The last round of golf Johnson caddied for Thomas was at the 2021 Ryder Cup. Mackay stepped into the role at the CJ Cup.

On May 22, 2022, Thomas won his second major and second PGA Championship, defeating Will Zalatoris in a playoff, overcoming a PGA Championship record 7-shot deficit entering the day.

2022–23 PGA Tour
Thomas qualified for the U.S. team at the 2022 Presidents Cup; he won all four matches paired with Jordan Spieth but lost in the singles.

Controversy
On January 9, 2021, during the third round of the Sentry Tournament of Champions in Hawaii, Thomas drew criticism for using a homophobic slur to express anger over a missed putt. Despite Thomas expressing contrition over the incident, describing his language as "inexcusable", sponsors Ralph Lauren and Woodford Reserve ended their relationships with him.

Amateur wins
2010 Terra Cotta Invitational
2012 Jones Cup Invitational

Professional wins (17)

PGA Tour wins (15)

1Co-sanctioned by the Asian Tour

PGA Tour playoff record (4–2)

European Tour wins (4)

European Tour playoff record (1–1)

Web.com Tour wins (1)

Web.com Tour playoff record (1–0)

Other wins (1)

Major championships

Wins (2)

1Defeated Will Zalatoris in a three-hole playoff: Thomas (4-3-4=11), Zalatoris (4-4-x=x).

Results timeline
Results not in chronological order in 2020.

CUT = missed the half-way cut
"T" indicates a tie for a place
NT = No tournament due to COVID-19 pandemic

Summary

Most consecutive cuts made – 7 (2015 PGA – 2017 U.S. Open)
Longest streak of top-10s – 2 (twice)

The Players Championship

Wins (1)

Results timeline

"T" indicates a tie for a place
C = Canceled after the first round due to the COVID-19 pandemic

World Golf Championships

Wins (2)

Results timeline

1Cancelled due to COVID-19 pandemic

QF, R16, R32, R64 = Round in which player lost in match play
NT = no tournament
"T" = tied
Note that the Championship and Invitational were discontinued from 2022.

PGA Tour career summary

*As of the 2020-21 season.

U.S. national team appearances
Amateur
Junior Ryder Cup: 2010 (winners)
Eisenhower Trophy: 2012 (winners)
Palmer Cup: 2012, 2013 (winners)
Walker Cup: 2013 (winners)

Professional
Presidents Cup: 2017 (winners), 2019 (winners), 2022 (winners)
Ryder Cup: 2018, 2021 (winners)

In popular culture
He appears on the cover of the 2020 video game PGA Tour 2K21.

See also
List of men's major championships winning golfers
2014 Web.com Tour Finals graduates
Lowest rounds of golf

References

External links

Alabama Crimson Tide bio

American male golfers
Alabama Crimson Tide men's golfers
PGA Tour golfers
Winners of men's major golf championships
Ryder Cup competitors for the United States
Olympic golfers of the United States
Golfers at the 2020 Summer Olympics
Korn Ferry Tour graduates
Golfers from Kentucky
St. Xavier High School (Louisville) alumni
Sportspeople from Louisville, Kentucky
People from Oldham County, Kentucky
1993 births
Living people